Allt för Sverige (literally Everything for Sweden, marketed in the United States as The Great Swedish Adventure) is a Swedish Emmy-award-winning reality show based on the original Norwegian format The Great Norway Adventure, also called Alt for Norge. The first season of Allt för Sverige was shown on Sveriges Television SVT1 from 30 October 2011 to 18 December 2011. The series is about Swedish Americans who return to their Swedish roots. The program provides the participants more information about their ancestral families by visiting some locations their ancestors lived. The cast members learn about the country's culture, customs, food, and quirks. As the episodes in the season progress, cast members leave the show after losing challenges and therefore find out less about their ancestry. Each season's winner gets a family reunion with their current relatives who stayed behind in Sweden.

The host of the program is Anders Lundin.

Awards and Recognitions

Season 1 (2011)

Contestants
Janis Babcock, 40, Minnesota
Eric Chellen, 50, Minneapolis, Minnesota
Guy Clark, 50, Middletown, New York
Shastin Corona, 35, St. Augustine, Florida
Brian Gerard, 39, Louisville, Kentucky
Jennifer Grannis, 40, Ponte Vedra, Florida
Kirstin Highfield, 28, Colorado Springs, Colorado
Greg Magnuson, 37, Los Angeles, California
Jessica Pleyel, 22, Grand Rapids, Michigan
Brett Ratell, 46, Bay City, Michigan

Episodes

Winner: Brian Gerard

In the eighth and final episode, filmed on the island of Utö and broadcast December 18, 2011, the Kentucky preacher Brian Gerard, New York City designer Guy Clark, Colorado student Kirstin Highfield and Florida police officer Shastin Corona participated in the final. Kirstin and Shastin ended up at 3rd and 4th place respectively, leaving Brian and Guy competing for 1st place. In the end it was Brian who won by less than 10 seconds in the final. Brian got to meet the Swedish part of his family at the end of the last show.

Season 2 (2012)
Season two began airing on 28 October 2012 at 8:00 PM on SVT1.

Contestants
 Walter E. Beck, 51, Colorado Springs, Colorado
 Vernon Neil Ferguson, 42, Roanoke, Virginia
 Karen G. Peterson French, 55, Connecticut
 Thure Gustafsson, 48, Atlanta, Georgia
 Travis Scott McAfee, 32, Arkansas
 Anna Brita Östman Mohr, 32, Montana
 Meghan Reilly, 22, Chicago, Illinois
 Matthew Lidfors Robinson, 34, Chicago, Illinois
 Kelsey Stiles, 24, San Francisco, California
 Debra Sisneros Sutherland, 32, Minnesota

Episodes

Winner: Anna Brita Östman Mohr won the show and met her relatives from the High Coast valley in central Sweden.

Season 3 (2013)
The third season of Allt För Sverige was filmed during the month of June 2013, and was broadcast in Sweden during the autumn of 2013.

Contestants
Dawn Anderson, Los Angeles
Matthew Anderson, 39, Washington
Eric Basir, 39, Illinois
Dianne Bennett, 70, California
Shane Booth, 36, North Carolina
Laura McIntyre, 31, New York
Lori Ferguson, 43, Florida
Michael Peterson, 41, Texas
Rebecca Redner, 40, Texas
John Stenson, 47, Wisconsin

Episodes
 The winner of Allt för Sverige season 3 was Lori Ferguson, who met her relatives from Skåne in southern Sweden.

Season 4 (2014)
Season four was filmed over summer 2014.

Contestants
 Nathaniel "Nate" Butler, 48, musician, Fresno, California.
 George Strid, 60, composer, Olympia, Washington.
 Troy Bankord, 49, landscape architect, Palm Springs, California.
 Nicholas "Nick" Jones, 35, barber, Valley Village, California.
 Jennette Landes, 37, hair stylist, Georgetown, Colorado.
 Leslie Longoria, 49, shop assistant, Waelder, Texas.
 Katie Malik, 34, accountant / singer / yoga instructor, Gig Harbor, Washington.
 John Olson, 30, waiter / writer / actor, Indianapolis, Indiana.
 Courtney Schlagel, 25 years, Dallas, Texas.
 Amanda Vinicky, aged 32, political reporter, Springfield, Illinois.

Episodes

The winner of season four was John Olson who met 120 relatives in Trollhättan, Västergötland. Katie Malik, George Strid and Courtney Schlagel came in 2nd, 3rd and 4th places, respectively.

Christmas Special 2014
In the Christmas special four Americans from previous seasons visit the town of Gällivare in northern Sweden in winter, but without having to compete for a single prize. Guy Clark (Season 1), Rebecca Redner (Season 3), Katie Malik (Season 4), and Nick Jones (Season 4) are able to meet with Swedish relatives as well as sample Swedish Christmas traditions. Anders Lundin hosts.

Season 5 (2015)
Season five casting calls opened in December 2014. It was filmed in Sweden over the summer of 2015.

Contestants
 Nathan Arling, 36, drummer, Chicago, Illinois
 Karen Berg-Roylance, 46, writer/editor and housewife, Fruit Heights, Utah
 Alexis Bunten, 37, researcher, Monterey, California
 Kurt Engstrom, 45, sales, Tustin, California
 Brooke Langton, 44, actor, Los Angeles, California
 Jamie Lystra, 30, Executive Assistant, West Olive, Michigan
 James Morgan, 42, medical student, Andersonville, Chicago, Illinois
 Beverly Wassberg, 65, retired, Plano, Texas
 Charles Wassberg, 66, retired, Plano, Texas
 John Winscher, 33, actor and motion capture artist, Atlanta, Georgia
 Jenna Wroblewski, 20, student, Madison, Wisconsin

Episodes

The winner of season five was John Winscher, who met his relatives on the island of Tjörn, Västra Götaland. Jamie Lystra, Beverly and Charles Wassberg, and Karen Berg-Roylance came in 2nd, 3rd, and 4th places, respectively.

Season 6 (2016)
Season six casting calls opened in December 2015. It was filmed in Sweden in May and June 2016.

Contestants 
 Erica Andersson, 65, professor of psychology, San Francisco, California
 Jason Blohm, 49, insurance, Los Angeles, California
 John Burt, 45, lawyer, Herriman, Utah
 Micka Cain, 34, writer, Cincinnati, Ohio
 Patrick Glass, 30, chef, Spokane, Washington
 Anna LoPinto, 25, cowgirl, Nashville, Tennessee
 Inger Romero, 44, housewife and homeschooler, Temecula, California
 Erik "Swede" Seaholm, 38, special needs teacher, Austin, Texas
 Sarah Steinman, 30, wilderness guide, Minneapolis, Minnesota 
 Steven Swanson, 35, MMA fighter, Palm Springs, CA

Episodes

The winner of season six was Sarah Steinman, who met her relatives near Skara, Västra Götaland. Micka Cain, Patrick Glass, and Steven Swanson came in 2nd, 3rd, and 4th places, respectively.

Season 7 (2017)
Season seven casting calls opened in December 2016. It was filmed in Sweden in May and June 2017. The seventh season of Allt för Sverige premiered on October 22, 2017 and was broadcast on SVT1.

Contestants 
 Victoria "Tori" Allen, 28; waitress; Denver, Colorado
 Kurt Carlson, 60; glass blower; Naples, New York
 Alexander Kronholm (now known as Tej Mohan Singh Khalsa), 27; yoga instructor; Boston, Massachusetts
 Kristin Lancione, 32; traveler Los Angeles, California
 Amanda Orozco, 29; political science graduate; Portland, Oregon
 Ann Oswald, 65; retired dental hygienist; Hickory, North Carolina
 Dylan Ratell, 26; musical performer; New York and Michigan
 Cosondra Sjostrom; 34, entrepreneur/curator; LA / Astoria, Oregon
 Jack Waters, 34; editor/writer; Salt Lake City, Utah
 Nathan Younggren; 25, farmer; Hallock, Minnesota

Episodes

The winner of season seven was Dylan Ratell, who met his relatives near Näshulta, Södermanland. Tori Allen, Cosondra Sjostrom, and Ann Oswald came in 2nd, 3rd, and 4th places, respectively.

Season 8 (2018)
Season eight casting calls opened in December 2017. It was filmed in Sweden in May and June 2018. The eighth season of Allt för Sverige premiered on September 16, 2018 and was broadcast on SVT1 and SVT Play.

Contestants 
 Kevin Chown, 48; Rock Musician; Escanaba, Michigan
 Tanya Edgil, 39; Housewife Student; Hamilton, Alabama
 Domonique Jackson-Russell, 34; Lawyer; Seattle, Washington
 Kyle Johnson, 29; Teacher; Independence, Minnesota
 Louis Larson, 52; Musician; Covington, Kentucky
 Andrew Morrisson; 27, Documentary Filmmaker; Scandia, Minnesota
 Ashley Mullinax, 32; Teacher; Clifton, Virginia
 David Neslund, 44; CAD Designer; Sutton, Alaska
 Susan Snyder, 58; Sales Representative; Roswell, New Mexico
 Christina Wight, 34; Specialist Teacher; Maryville, Tennessee

Episodes

Season 9 (2019)
Season nine casting calls opened in December 2018. It was filmed in Sweden in May and June 2019. The eighth season of Allt för Sverige premiered on October 27, 2019 and was broadcast on SVT1 and SVT Play.

Contestants 
 Jennifer Buhrow, 48; actress/clown; Chicago, Illinois; origin Värmland
 Janet "Holgie" Caplinger, 70; former dancer; Wyndham, Kansas (currently: Joshua Tree, California); origin Småland
 Kaytie Hubis, 30; restaurant manager; San Diego, California; origin Småland
 Robert Rambo, 59; war veteran; Cullowhee, North Carolina; origin Västergötland
 Roy "Dude" Settergren III, 41; Farmer; Wacissa, Florida; origin Östergötland
 Christina Sittser, 23; clothing designer; St. Louis, Missouri (currently: Los Angeles); origin Småland
 Christopher Tholstrom, 40; salesman; Denver, Colorado; origin Småland
 Mats Thureson, 22; carpenter; Burlington, Vermont; origin Scania
 Melissa Walls, 38; researcher; Duluth, Minnesota; origin Dalarna
 Brittany "Britt" Zikman, 28; project manager; Winnipeg, Canada; origin Jämtland

Episodes

US casting
Casting each year is announced through The Great Swedish Adventure.

References

External links
 Allt för Sverige's American homepage
 ''Allt för Sverige'''s homepage at SVT.se
 Cast-run Facebook page
 Cast-run Twitter page

Sveriges Television original programming
Swedish reality television series
International Emmy Award for Best Non-Scripted Entertainment winners
Swedish-American culture